Luogosanto (Gallurese: Locusantu) is a comune (municipality) in the Province of Sassari in the Italian region Sardinia, located about  north of Cagliari and about  northwest of Olbia.

Luogosanto borders the following municipalities: Aglientu, Arzachena, Luras, Tempio Pausania.

References

External links
Official website 

Cities and towns in Sardinia
1947 establishments in Italy
States and territories established in 1947